is a district of Shinjuku, Tokyo, Japan. It is a single town name that does not have any districts or sub-sections (i.e., "-chome"). Thus, no residential addressing system has been implemented and the postal code is 160-0015.

Demographics 
The number of households and population of each chōme as of December 1, 2019 are as follows:

Education
The Shinjuku City Board of Education operates public elementary and junior high schools. Daikyōchō is zoned to Yotsuya No. 6 (Dairoku) Elementary School (四谷第六小学校) and Yotsuya Junior High School (四谷中学校).

References

External links

Districts of Shinjuku